Tortoise Hanba's Stories is a large scale 3D-CG Chinese animation TV series in China.  It is also referred to as The Story of Hanbagui or Hanbagui.

Background
The show was produced by "Shenzhen Toonring Animation" in Shenzhen with an estimated final budget of 30 million RMB (about $US 3.7 million).  It has completed 52 episodes by the 2nd half of 2006, and is projecting 500 episodes over the next few years.

Story
The first 52 episodes called “Falling on the Earth” tells how “Hanbagui”, the turtle, comes across the teenagers “Abu”, “Annie”, “Siaomei” on earth and makes friends with them.  He goes looking for his lost fellows “Baobaoxiong”, “Tiejiaxiaozi”, “Baizhangtia", “Baijingling”, “Qixingpiao”.  It is a comedy.

References
 CNICIF
 IT.com.cn

External links
 Hanbagui Business Info

Chinese children's animated comedy television series
Computer-animated television series
2006 Chinese television series debuts
2008 Chinese television series endings
2000s animated television series
China Central Television original programming
Mandarin-language television shows
Animated television series about turtles